or  is a mountain in the Saltfjellet mountain range in the municipality of Rana in Nordland county, Norway.

At the southeastern foot of the mountain sits Bolna Station, a railway station on the Nordland Line.  The Norwegian Mountain Touring Association has a mountain lodge named Bolnastua located only  from the railway station. The cabin was completed in 1993 and has 13 beds.  The European route E6 highway and the river Ranelva both pass along the south and eastern side of the mountain.  The station and Bolnastua cabin are both situated in a mountain birch forest near the treeline.

References

External links
 Bolnastua cabin

Mountains of Nordland
Rana, Norway